The Three Rivers Casino and Resort is a resort on the southern Oregon Coast. There are two locations, one in Florence and one in Coos Bay.

It is owned by the Confederated Tribes of Coos, Lower Umpqua, & Siuslaw Indians. The resort is named for the Coos, Umpqua, and Siuslaw rivers, which flow into the Pacific Ocean in southern Oregon. The Florence location, opened in 2004, includes a 93-room hotel, opened in 2007, and adjoining Ocean Dunes Golf Course, purchased in 2012. It is the second-largest employer in the city. The Coos Bay location was opened in May 2015.

See also
 Gambling in Oregon

References

External links
 

Resorts in Oregon
Companies based in Oregon
Casinos in Oregon
Buildings and structures in Lane County, Oregon
Tourist attractions in Lane County, Oregon
Buildings and structures in Coos County, Oregon
Tourist attractions in Coos County, Oregon
Coos Bay, Oregon
Casinos completed in 2004
2004 establishments in Oregon
Casinos completed in 2015
2015 establishments in Oregon
Casino hotels
Native American casinos
Native American history of Oregon